Periclimenes exederens is a species of saltwater shrimp in the family, Palaemonidae, and was first described in 1969 by Alexander James Bruce.

The holotype was collected in the South China Sea, at a depth of 47-48 fathoms on 21 February 1965.

References

Palaemonidae
Crustaceans described in 1969